Day Hort MacDowall (March 6, 1850 – October 28, 1927) was a politician from old Northwest Territories, Canada.

Born in Carruth House, Renfrewshire, Scotland, MacDowall immigrated to Canada in 1879. He was elected as a member of the Legislative Assembly of Northwest Territories in 1883 and served until 1885. He was an early prominent resident of Prince Albert, Saskatchewan and connected to the Conservative Party of Canada.

He was elected to the House of Commons of Canada in 1887 and re-elected in 1891 for the Saskatchewan (Provisional District) defeating the father of famed author Lucy Maud Montgomery. He served until 1896.

The village of MacDowall, Saskatchewan is named after him.

References

External links
 
 Prominent men of Canada : a collection of persons distinguished in professional and political life and in the commerce and industry of Canada

1850 births
1927 deaths
Members of the House of Commons of Canada from the Northwest Territories
Members of the Legislative Assembly of the Northwest Territories
Politicians from Prince Albert, Saskatchewan
Scottish emigrants to Canada
Pre-Confederation Saskatchewan people
19th-century Canadian politicians